Dekemhare Comprehensive Secondary School (Tigrinya: ቤትትምህርቲ ካልኣይ ደረጃ ደቀምሓረ) is a public secondary school located in Dekemhare, Eritrea. It was constructed in 1967.

See also

 Education in Eritrea

20th-century establishments in Eritrea
1967 establishments in Africa
Dekemhare
Educational institutions established in 1967
High schools and secondary schools in Eritrea
Public schools in Eritrea